St Luke's is an area in central London in the Borough of Islington. It lies just north of the border with the City of London near the Barbican Estate, and the Clerkenwell and Shoreditch areas. The area takes its name from the now redundant parish church of St Luke's, on Old Street west of Old Street station. Following the closure of the church, the parish was reabsorbed into that of St Giles-without-Cripplegate, from which it had separated in 1733.

Geography
The area of the former parish extends north from the City of London boundary to City Road, with a small part, around City Road Basin lying north of City Road. Goswell Road forms the western boundary with Clerkenwell, while the areas northern and eastern boundaries with the Shoreditch area of the London Borough of Hackney area have been adopted by the London Borough of Islington. St Luke's is inside the London Congestion Charging Zone, the Ultra Low Emission Zone, and is located in Zone 1. The nearest tube and railway stations are Barbican, Farringdon and Old Street.

History
The civil and ecclesiastical parish of St Luke's was created on the construction of the church in 1733, from the part of the existing parish of St Giles Cripplegate outside the City of London. The area covered by the parish is the same as that previously occupied by the landholding known as the Manor of Finsbury.

Being outside the City boundaries, the parish had a large non-conformist population. John Wesley's house and Wesley's Chapel are in City Road, as is Bunhill Fields burial ground.

In 1751, St Luke's Hospital for Lunatics, an asylum, was founded. It was rebuilt in 1782–1784 by George Dance the Younger. In 1917, the site was sold to the Bank of England for St Luke's Printing Works, which printed banknotes. The building was damaged by the Blitz of 1940, and the printing works were relocated in 1958 to Debden, Essex.

The Grade II listed Ironmonger Row Baths were built as a public wash house in 1931. Turkish baths were added in 1938.

The civil parish became officially known as "St Luke's Middlesex". The parish was historically in the county of Middlesex, and was included in the area of the Metropolitan Board of Works in 1855. Under the Metropolis Management Act 1855 any parish that exceeded 2,000 ratepayers was to be divided into wards; as such the incorporated vestry of St Luke was divided into five wards (electing vestrymen): No. 1 (12), No. 2 (6), No. 3 (9), No. 4 (12) and No. 5 (9).

From 1889 it was part of the County of London. The vestry administered local government in the area until the civil parish became part of the Metropolitan Borough of Finsbury in 1899. In 1965, that borough was amalgamated with the Metropolitan Borough of Islington to form the London Borough of Islington.

The eponymous parish church closed in 1959 after its structure was found to be unsafe, and the parish reunited with St Giles-without-Cripplegate. The church building has been restored and is now home to a concert hall and rehearsal space used by the London Symphony Orchestra.

Street name etymologies
St Luke's has no formal boundaries. Those used here form a rough triangle: City Road and Finsbury Pavement/Finsbury Square to the east, the boundary with the City of London to the south, and Goswell Road to the west.

 Anchor Yard – after a former inn here of this name
 Angel Gate
 Baldwin Street – after Richard Baldwin, Treasurer at St Bartholomew's Hospital when the street was built in 1811
 Baltic Street East and Baltic Street West – the streets here were built by a timber merchant  1810, who named them after trade-related activities; Baltic refers to the Baltic softwood trade
 Banner Street – after the Banner family, late 18th-century landowners in the area
 Bartholomew Square – built in 1811 on land owned by St Bartholomew's Hospital
 Bastwick Street – unknown; possibly after Bastwick in Norfolk
 Bath Street – after the former Peerless Pool here, later turned into a bath; it was formerly Pest House Row, after a plague hospital built here in the Tudor era (demolished 1736)
 Beard Street
 Bunhill Row – after the adjacent Bunhill Fields cemetery, the original phrase being 'bone hill'
 Cahill Street – thought to be named after a trustee of the Peabody Donation Fund, who redeveloped this former slum area in the 1880s
 Cayton Place and Cayton Street – renamed, after the village in Yorkshire, from New Street in 1805, to avoid confusion with other streets of this name
 Central Street – named thus in 1861, for it lay in the centre of St Luke's Parish
 Chequer Street – after the former Chequers tavern here
 Cherry Tree Walk
 Chiswell Street – old term meaning stony/gravelly earthor a corruption of 'Choice Well', denoting a source of clean water
 City Road – as it connects Islington to the City of London
 Crescent Row – descriptive, after its shape
 Dingley Place and Dingley Road – after Charles Dingley, who instigated the construction of City Road in 1756
 Domingo Street – the streets here were built by a timber merchant  1810, who named them after trade-related activities; Domingo is an alternative name for Hispaniola, a source of mahogany
 Dufferin Avenue and Dufferin Court – thought to be named after a trustee of the Peabody Donation Fund, who redeveloped this former slum area in the 1880s
 Errol Street – thought to be named after a trustee of the Peabody Donation Fund, who redeveloped this former slum area in the 1880s
 Europa Place – unknown
 Exchange Street – after the former Clerkenwell Telephone Exchange
 Featherstone Street – after the Featherstone family, local landowners after Matthew Featherstone bought land here in 1732
 Finsbury Pavement, Finsbury Square and Finsbury Street – after a Saxon burgh (settlement) owned by someone called Finn
 Fortune Street – after the Fortune Playhouse, which formerly stood here on the junction with Golden Lane; it was closed in 1648
 Fredericks's Row 
 Galway Street – after Henri de Massue, Earl of Galway, first governor of the French Hospital that was formerly here
 Gard Street – after a member of the nearby Orphan Working School
 Garrett Street – after a person of this name who was a member of the local parish vestry Works Committee
 Gee Street – after its 1784 builder, Osgood Gee
 George Gillett Court – for George Gillett, local politician in the early 20th century 
 Golden Lane – formerly Goldynglane, thought to be after a local property owner of the name Golding/Golda
 Goswell Road – there is dispute over the origins of the name, with some sources claiming the road was named after a nearby garden called 'Goswelle' or 'Goderell' which belonged to Robert de Ufford, 1st Earl of Suffolk, while others state it derives from "God's Well", and the traditional pagan practice of well-worship, or a former 'Gode Well' located here
 Hall Street – after James and Joseph Hall, who built the street in 1822
 Helmet Row – after the Worshipful Company of Ironmongers, who owned this land; its coat of arms incorporates a helmet motif
 Honduras Street – the streets here were built by a timber merchant  1810, who named them after trade-related activities; Honduras was a source of mahogany
 Hull Street – after its 18th-century builder, William Hulls
 Ironmonger Passage and Ironmonger Row – after the Worshipful Company of Ironmongers, who owned this land
 King Square – built 1820, and named for George IV
 Lamb's Buildings and Lamb's Passage – after its early 19th-century owner William (or Thomas) Lamb; it was formerly known as Great Swordbearers Alley
 Lever Street – unknown
 Lizard Street – after the Worshipful Company of Ironmongers, who owned this land; their arms incorporates a salamander motif
 Ludlow Street – unknown
 Macclesfield Road – after George Parker, 4th Earl of Macclesfield, chairman of the canal company in the 17th century
 Mallow Street – after the former mallow field located here
 Martha's Buildings
 Masons Place and Masons Yard
 Memel Court and Memel Street – the streets here were built by a timber merchant  1810, who named them after trade-related activities; Memel was a timber-exporting port in Germany (now Klaipėda in Lithuania)
 Mitchell Street – after John Mitchell, who bequeathed this land to the Worshipful Company of Ironmongers in 1527
 Moor Lane – after the marshy moorlands that formerly stood here
 Mora Street – after the prebend of Moor/Mora, belonging to St Paul's Cathedral, named for the local moors
 Moreland Street – after the Moreland family, prominent locally in the 19th century
 Mount Mills – after a former mount here supporting a windmill, later a chapel, and then in the Civil War a raised battery; it was levelled in 1750
 Nag's Head Court – after a former inn of this name
 Nelson Passage – after Admiral Horatio Nelson
 New Charles Street – as this formerly led to a Charles Street, named for Charles II
 Norman Street – after bricklayer William Norman, who leased land here in the 1750s
 Old Street – after its age, thought to have ultimately Roman origins
 Paton Street – unknown
 Pear Tree Street – after the pear trees formerly grown here
 Peerless Street – site of the Peerless Pool, a bath used in the 18th century, thought to be a corruption of ‘perilous’
 Pickard Street – after a clergyman of this name who founded the Orphan Working School here in 1754
 President Street
 Radnor Street – after the Earls of Radnor, who governed the French Hospital that was formerly here
 Red Cow Lane
 Ropemaker Street – descriptive, after the rope making trade formerly located here
 Roscoe Street – thought to be named after a trustee of the Peabody Donation Fund, who redeveloped this former slum area in the 1880s
 St Agnes Well – after an ancient well thought to have been located about 200 metres to the east, at the junction of Old Street and Great Eastern Street. Remnants of the well can be found within Old Street station.
 St Luke's Close – after the adjacent St Luke Old Street church
 Seward Street – after Edward Seward, who owned a dyeworks here in the 18th century
 Sidney Grove 
 Sundial Court
 Sutton's Way
 Sycamore Street – by association with the nearby Timber Street, or possibly after an inn of this name
 Timber Street – the streets here were built by a timber merchant  1810, who named them after trade-related activities
 Wakley Street – after 19th-century surgeon and social reformer Thomas Wakley
 Warwick Yard – unknown
 Whitecross Street – after a white cross which stood near here in the 1200s
 Withers Place – after William Withers, 18th-century property owner
 Youngs Buildings – after Francis Young, local 18th-century property owner

Whitecross Street Market

Whitecross Street Market is a market with stalls arranged in Whitecross Street and the road closed to traffic. There is a small general market every weekday, and a larger food market on Thursdays and Fridays. It has occasional food festivals.

The market dates to the 17th century, and was formerly one of London's great Sunday markets, although today trading is largely limited to lunchtimes. By the end of the 19th century, the area had become a by-word for poverty and alcohol abuse. It became known as Squalors' Market.

St Luke's Parochial Trust
St Luke's Parochial Trust is an historic charity still operating in the St Luke's area, fulfilling its original purpose of improving the lives of local people. It has its origins in the gifts of land and money from benefactors to the ancient parish as far back as the 16th century. The charity owns and manages a busy community centre on Central Street, from which a wide range of community activities and services are delivered and coordinated.

The community centre was originally the Central Street Board School, one of many Victorian era schools built and managed by the London School Board. The school closed during the Second World War whilst local school children were evacuated to the countryside to avoid the Blitz. The school reopened and operated after the war as the Frank Barnes School for the Deaf until the mid-1970s. St Luke's Parochial Trust purchased the building in 1979, and converted it to a community centre which was opened by Queen Elizabeth II in 1982.

Transport
The nearest stations are Barbican, Farringdon, Moorgate and Old Street London Underground Northern line (City branch) and the National Rail Northern City Line (which is operated by Great Northern) providing services at Old Street station on St Luke's eastern edge.

Notes

References

External links
 St Luke's Parochial Trust homepage
  Islington Museum and Local History Centre

Districts of the London Borough of Islington
Areas of London
Parishes governed by vestries (Metropolis)
Bills of mortality parishes